Skurishenskaya is a rural locality (a stanitsa) in Glazunovskoye Rural Settlement, Kumylzhensky District, Volgograd Oblast, Russia. The population was 799 as of 2010. There are 17 streets.

Geography 
Skurishenskaya is located in forest steppe, on Khopyorsko-Buzulukskaya Plain, on the right bank of the Medveditsa River, 33 km southeast of Kumylzhenskaya (the district's administrative centre) by road. Blizhny is the nearest rural locality.

References 

Rural localities in Kumylzhensky District